

Cities and towns under the krai's jurisdiction
Krasnodar (Краснодар) (administrative center)
city okrugs:
Karasunsky (Карасунский)
with 2 rural okrugs under the city okrug's jurisdiction.
Prikubansky (Прикубанский)
with 3 rural okrugs under the city okrug's jurisdiction.
Tsentralny (Центральный)
Zapadny (Западный)
Anapa (Анапа)
with 2 rural okrugs under the town's jurisdiction.
Armavir (Армавир)
with 3 rural okrugs under the town's jurisdiction.
Belorechensk (Белореченск)
with 1 rural okrug under the town's jurisdiction.
Gelendzhik (Геленджик)
with 4 selsovets under the town's jurisdiction.
Goryachy Klyuch (Горячий Ключ)
with 7 rural okrugs under the town's jurisdiction.
Kropotkin (Кропоткин)
Krymsk (Крымск)
Labinsk (Лабинск)
Novorossiysk (Новороссийск)
city districts:
Primorsky (Приморский)
Tsentralny (Центральный)
Vostochny (Восточный)
Yuzhny (Южный)
with 6 rural okrugs under the city's jurisdiction.
Slavyansk-na-Kubani (Славянск-на-Кубани)
Sochi (Сочи)
city districts:
Adlersky (Адлерский)
Urban-type settlements under the city district's jurisdiction:
Krasnaya Polyana (Красная Поляна)
with 3 rural okrugs under the city district's jurisdiction.
Khostinsky (Хостинский)
with 2 rural okrugs under the city district's jurisdiction.
Lazarevsky (Лазаревский)
with 6 rural okrugs under the city district's jurisdiction.
Tsentralny (Центральный)
Tikhoretsk (Тихорецк)
with 1 rural okrug under the town's jurisdiction.
Tuapse (Туапсе)
Yeysk (Ейск)
with 1 rural okrug under the town's jurisdiction.

Federal territory
Urban-type settlements:
 Sirius (Сириус)

Districts
Abinsky (Абинский)
Towns under the district's jurisdiction:
Abinsk (Абинск)
Urban-type settlements under the district's jurisdiction:
Akhtyrsky (Ахтырский)
with 6 rural okrugs under the district's jurisdiction.
Anapsky (Анапский)
with 8 rural okrugs under the district's jurisdiction.
Apsheronsky (Апшеронский)
Towns under the district's jurisdiction:
Apsheronsk (Апшеронск)
Khadyzhensk (Хадыженск)
Urban-type settlements under the district's jurisdiction:
Neftegorsk (Нефтегорск)
with 9 rural okrugs under the district's jurisdiction.
Beloglinsky (Белоглинский)
with 4 rural okrugs and stanitsa okrugs under the district's jurisdiction.
Belorechensky (Белореченский)
with 9 rural okrugs under the district's jurisdiction.
Bryukhovetsky (Брюховецкий)
with 8 rural okrugs under the district's jurisdiction.
Dinskoy (Динской)
with 10 rural okrugs under the district's jurisdiction.
Gulkevichsky (Гулькевичский)
Towns under the district's jurisdiction:
Gulkevichi (Гулькевичи)
Urban-type settlements under the district's jurisdiction:
Girey (Гирей)
Krasnoselsky (Красносельский)
with 12 rural okrugs and stanitsa okrugs under the district's jurisdiction.
Kalininsky (Калининский)
with 8 rural okrugs under the district's jurisdiction.
Kanevskoy (Каневской)
with 9 rural okrugs under the district's jurisdiction.
Kavkazsky (Кавказский)
with 8 rural okrugs under the district's jurisdiction.
Korenovsky (Кореновский)
Towns under the district's jurisdiction:
Korenovsk (Кореновск)
with 9 rural okrugs under the district's jurisdiction.
Krasnoarmeysky (Красноармейский)
with 10 rural okrugs under the district's jurisdiction.
Krylovsky (Крыловский)
with 6 rural okrugs under the district's jurisdiction.
Krymsky (Крымский)
with 10 rural okrugs under the district's jurisdiction.
Kurganinsky (Курганинский)
Towns under the district's jurisdiction:
Kurganinsk (Курганинск)
with 9 rural okrugs under the district's jurisdiction.
Kushchyovsky (Кущёвский)
with 13 rural okrugs under the district's jurisdiction.
Labinsky (Лабинский)
with 12 rural okrugs under the district's jurisdiction.
Leningradsky (Ленинградский)
with 12 rural okrugs under the district's jurisdiction.
Mostovsky (Мостовский)
Urban-type settlements under the district's jurisdiction:
Mostovskoy (Мостовской)
Psebay (Псебай)
with 12 rural okrugs under the district's jurisdiction.
Novokubansky (Новокубанский)
Towns under the district's jurisdiction:
Novokubansk (Новокубанск)
with 8 rural okrugs under the district's jurisdiction.
Novopokrovsky (Новопокровский)
with 8 rural okrugs under the district's jurisdiction.
Otradnensky (Отрадненский)
with 14 rural okrugs under the district's jurisdiction.
Pavlovsky (Павловский)
with 11 rural okrugs and stanitsa okrugs under the district's jurisdiction.
Primorsko-Akhtarsky (Приморско-Ахтарский)
Towns under the district's jurisdiction:
Primorsko-Akhtarsk (Приморско-Ахтарск)
with 8 rural okrugs under the district's jurisdiction.
Seversky (Северский)
Urban-type settlements under the district's jurisdiction:
Afipsky (Афипский)
Chernomorsky (Черноморский)
Ilsky (Ильский)
with 9 rural okrugs under the district's jurisdiction.
Shcherbinovsky (Щербиновский)
with 8 rural okrugs under the district's jurisdiction.
Slavyansky (Славянский)
with 14 rural okrugs under the district's jurisdiction.
Starominsky (Староминский)
with 5 rural okrugs under the district's jurisdiction.
Tbilissky (Тбилисский)
with 8 rural okrugs under the district's jurisdiction.
Temryuksky (Темрюкский)
Towns under the district's jurisdiction:
Temryuk (Темрюк)
with 11 rural okrugs under the district's jurisdiction.
Tikhoretsky (Тихорецкий)
with 11 rural okrugs under the district's jurisdiction.
Timashyovsky (Тимашёвский)
Towns under the district's jurisdiction:
Timashyovsk (Тимашёвск)
with 9 rural okrugs under the district's jurisdiction.
Tuapsinsky (Туапсинский)
Urban-type settlements under the district's jurisdiction:
Dzhubga resort settlement (Джубга)
Novomikhaylovsky resort settlement (Новомихайловский)
with 7 rural okrugs under the district's jurisdiction.
Uspensky (Успенский)
with 10 rural okrugs under the district's jurisdiction.
Ust-Labinsky (Усть-Лабинский)
Towns under the district's jurisdiction:
Ust-Labinsk (Усть-Лабинск)
with 13 rural okrugs under the district's jurisdiction.
Vyselkovsky (Выселковский)
with 10 rural okrugs under the district's jurisdiction.
Yeysky (Ейский)
with 10 rural okrugs under the district's jurisdiction.

References

Krasnodar Krai
Krasnodar Krai